The men's 200 metres at the 2022 European Athletics Championships will take place at the Olympiastadion on 18 and 19 August.

Records

Schedule

Results

Round 1
First 3 in each heat (Q) and the next 3 fastest  (q) advance to the Semifinals. The 12 highest ranked athletes received a bye into the semi-finals

Wind:Heat 1: -1.0 m/s, Heat 2: -0.6 m/s, Heat 3: +0.3 m/s

Semifinals
The twelve qualifiers from round 1 are joined by the twelve highest ranked athletes who received a bye. 

First 2 in each semifinal (Q) and the next 2 fastest (q) advance to the Final.

Wind:Heat 1: -1.0 m/s, Heat 2: -0.6 m/s, Heat 3: +0.3 m/s

Final

Olympiastadion - 19 Aug - 21:20

References

200 M
200 metres at the European Athletics Championships